Elections to the Baseball Hall of Fame for 1959 followed a system established after the 1956 election. The baseball writers were voting on recent players only in even-number years (until 1967). 
The Veterans Committee met in closed sessions to consider executives, managers, umpires, and earlier major league players. It selected outfielder Zack Wheat, who recorded 2884 hits from 1909 to 1927. A formal induction ceremony was held in Cooperstown, New York, on July 20, 1959, with Commissioner of Baseball Ford Frick presiding.

References

External links
1959 Election at www.baseballhalloffame.org

Baseball Hall of Fame balloting
Hall of Fame balloting